Eloji is a Gram-devta (god of village) folk deity. Statues of Eloji can be found in almost every village in western Rajasthan. He is shown as a strong man with a mustache exhibiting his long penis in any chowk, or center of a Dhani sitting comfortably with a look of pride on his face. Many songs are sung on holy days by villagers (known as Gair), while playing a folk music instrument similar to a drum, in the praise of his sexual power.

Ritual
Men beg him for sexual powers and females worship him to be gifted with a male child. On the day of Holi when all men sing Holi songs known as Phag which are songs describing their sexual accomplishments, the married women visit Eloji, bow to him, touch his elongated phallus with awe and tell jokes. It is a joyful ritual.

Newlywed couples pay homage to Eloji. The bride gives a hug to Eloji as He has first right over every woman. He is the best man for every  bride.

It is also a way of respecting the sexual power that governs the cosmos.

The three main festivals of India Holi, Diwali and Basant panchmi are based on three ego levels in a person: Id, ego, and super-ego. Rural India, especially Western Rajasthan, highlights the importance of sex and procreation, which are embodied in the worship of – Eloji.

Holi
Holi is a festival of abandonment and acknowledgement of animal instincts. In Indian society, sex is normally taboo; public expression of love or sexual desire is condemned. Yet, traditions such as Khajuraho and Tantra establish sex as a tool for self-realization in a person's spiritual journey. The love story of Eloji and Holika is famous in traditional folklore.

References

Rajasthani culture
Religion in Rajasthan
Folk deities of Rajasthan